Epichloë aotearoae is a systemic and seed-transmissible symbiont of Echinopogon ovatus, a grass endemic to Australia and New Zealand. It was originally described as a Neotyphodium species in 2002 but moved to Epichloë in 2014.

The fungus produces the anti-insect loline alkaloids. Unlike many other anamorphic Epichloë species, E. aotearoae does not appear to be a hybrid. Its closest teleomorphic (sexual) relative appears to be Epichloë typhina.

References 

aotearoae
Fungi of New Zealand
Fungi native to Australia
Fungi described in 2002